Elyas M'Barek (born 29 May 1982) is an Austrian actor based in Germany. He gained recognition for his roles in the comedy television series Türkisch für Anfänger and the 2013 comedy film Fack ju Göhte.

Early life 
M'Barek was born in Munich, to an Austrian mother and a Tunisian father. His younger brother Joseph is also an actor and lives in Germany. At the age of 22, M'Barek finished school.

Career
He began acting in 2001 in Dennis Gansel's sex comedy Mädchen, Mädchen. He is best known for playing Cem Öztürk, a young Turk, in Türkisch für Anfänger (2006). Alongside Arnel Taci, who in Türkisch für Anfänger was his best friend, he acted in the TV series "Abschnitt 40".

In 2008, he appeared in Gansel's acclaimed drama film Die Welle, in the role of Sinan, a student who embraces fascism. In 2012, he reunited with Mädchen, Mädchen and Die Welle co-star Max Riemelt in the drama film Heiter bis Wolkig opposite Jessica Schwarz and Anna Fischer and played a lead in the  feature film. He played a vampire in The Mortal Instruments: City of Bones (2013).

In 2013, he starred in Fack ju Göhte, which was seen by three million people in 17 days and became the most successful German film of the year. The same year he had a supporting role in the adventure film The Physician, which was also a box-office hit in Germany.
The same year, he voiced Art in the German version of Monsters University.

Filmography 
Film

2001: Mädchen, Mädchen - Blaubart
2002:  - Jochen Epstein - 19 Jahre
2006: Wholetrain - Elyas
2008: Die Welle - Sinan
2008: Morgen, ihr Luschen! Der Ausbilder-Schmidt-Film - KSKler #2
2008: Klaus
2009: Männerherzen - Aggro Berlin Member
2009: Zweiohrküken - Bernd
2010: Zeiten ändern dich - Young Bushido
2010: Teufelskicker - Flo
2011: What a Man - Okke
2011: Vicky and the Treasure of the Gods - Kerkerwächter 2
2012:  - Salim Hekimoglu
2012: Fünf Freunde - Tierfilmer Vince
2012:  - Cem Öztürk
2012: Heiter bis Wolkig - Can
2013: The Mortal Instruments: City of Bones - The Vampire Leader
2013: Fack ju Göhte - Zeki Müller
2013: The Physician - Karim
2014: Who Am I – No System is Safe - Max
2014:  - Eroll
2014: Paddington - Paddington (German version, voice, uncredited)
2015: Traumfrauen - Joseph
2015: Fack ju Göhte 2 - Zeki Müller
2016: Welcome to Germany - Dr. Tarek Berger
2017: Bullyparade – Der Film - Indian (uncredited)
2017: Fack ju Göhte 3 - Zeki Müller
2017: This Crazy Heart - Lenny Reinhard
2017: A.C.A. Demicus
2017:  - Himself
2019: The Collini Case - Caspar Leinen
2019:  - Leo Keschwari
2020: Nightlife - Milo
2020: What We Wanted

Television films
2002: Ich schenk dir einen Seitensprung - Rosenverkäufer
2002: Die Stimmen
2005: Deutschmänner - Machmuts Kumpel
2009: Die ProSieben Märchenstunde: Kalif Storch
2010:  - Sam McPhearson
2011: Rottmann schlägt zurück - Deniz Öktay
2011: Biss zur großen Pause – Das Highschool Vampir Grusical

Television series
2002: Verdammt verliebt - Mike Berger
2002: Samt und Seide
2002-2009: Tatort - Ferhat Korkmaz / Gast in Disco
2003: : Zeugenschutz
2004: Schulmädchen - Ali Can
2005-2008: Türkisch für Anfänger - Cem Öztürk
2006: Abschnitt 40 - Rajel Kalifeh
2007-2008: KDD – Kriminaldauerdienst - Timur
2008: Im Namen des Gesetzes - Mehmet Karan
2008: Großstadtrevier - Sven Klawitter
2009: Rosa Roth - Nejo Gül
2009: Notruf Hafenkante - Hassan Demir
2009: :  - Assistent der Handelskammer
2009: Alarm für Cobra 11 – Die Autobahnpolizei - Tim Bazman
2009-2011: Doctor’s Diary - Dr. Maurice Knechtlsdorfer
2010: Danni Lowinski - Rasoul Abbassi

References

External links 
 
 

1982 births
Living people
21st-century Austrian male actors
Austrian male television actors
Austrian male film actors
Austrian people of Tunisian descent
Male actors from Munich